"Rumble Fish" (stylized at "rumble fish") is Do As Infinity's fifth single, released in 2000. Originally, "Summer Days" was going to be used as the title track for the single but "Rumble Fish" was used for an unexplained reason according to the Do the A-side booklet, which also says that the single's jacket  was shot in Taiwan during their visit in 2000.

This song was included in the band's compilation album Do the A-side.

Track listing
"Rumble Fish"
"My Wish-My Life"
"Summer Days"
"Rumble Fish" (Instrumental)
"My Wish-My Life" (Instrumental)
"Summer Days" (Instrumental)
"Welcome!" (Dub's Re-fresh Mix)

Chart positions

External links
 "Rumble Fish" at Avex Network
 "Rumble Fish" at Oricon

2000 singles
Do As Infinity songs
Songs written by Dai Nagao
Song recordings produced by Seiji Kameda
Japanese film songs